The Pentagon is the headquarters building of the United States Department of Defense, in Arlington County, Virginia, across the Potomac River from Washington, D.C.. It was constructed on an accelerated schedule during World War II. As a symbol of the U.S. military, the phrase The Pentagon is often used as a metonym for the Department of Defense and its leadership.

The building was designed by American architect George Bergstrom and built by contractor John McShain. Ground was broken on 11 September 1941, and the building was dedicated on 15 January 1943. General Brehon Somervell provided the major impetus to gain Congressional approval for the project; Colonel Leslie Groves was responsible for overseeing the project for the U.S. Army Corps of Engineers, which supervised it.

Some 23,000 military and civilian employees, and another 3,000 non-defense support personnel, work in the Pentagon.

In 2001, the Pentagon was damaged during the September 11 attacks. Five al-Qaeda hijackers flew American Airlines Flight 77 into the western side of the building, killing themselves and 184 other people: 59 on the airplane and 125 in the Pentagon. It was the first significant foreign attack on government facilities in Washington, D.C. since the burning of Washington during the War of 1812. Following the attacks, the western side of the building was repaired, with a small indoor memorial and chapel added at the point of impact. An outdoor memorial dedicated to the Pentagon victims of 9/11 opened in 2008.

Layout and facilities

The Pentagon building spans , and includes an additional  as a central courtyard.

Starting with the north side and moving clockwise, its five façade entrances are the Mall Terrace, the River Terrace, the Concourse (or Metro Station), the South Parking, and the Heliport. On the north side of the building, the Mall Entrance, which also features a portico, leads out to a  terrace that is used for ceremonies. The River Entrance, which features a portico projecting out , is on the northeast side, overlooking the lagoon and facing Washington. A stepped terrace on the River Entrance leads down to the lagoon; and a landing dock was used until the late 1960s to ferry personnel between Bolling Air Force Base and the Pentagon. The main entrance for visitors is on the southeast side, as are the Pentagon Metro station and the bus station.

There is also a concourse on the southeast side of the second floor of the building, which contains a mini-shopping mall. The south parking lot adjoins the southwest façade, and the west side of the Pentagon faces Washington Boulevard.

The concentric rings are designated from the center out as "A" through "E" (with additional "F" and "G" rings in the basement). "E" Ring offices are the only ones with outside views and are generally occupied by senior officials. Office numbers go clockwise around each of the rings, and have two parts: a nearest-corridor number (1 to 10), followed by a bay number (00 to 99), so office numbers range from 100 to 1099. These corridors radiate out from the central courtyard, with corridor 1 beginning with the Concourse's south end. Each numbered radial corridor intersects with the corresponding numbered group of offices (for example, corridor 5 divides the 500 series office block). There are a number of historical displays in the building, particularly in the "A" and "E" rings.

Subterranean floors in the Pentagon are lettered "B" for Basement and "M" for Mezzanine. The concourse is on the second floor at the Metro entrance. Above-ground floors are numbered 1 to 5. Room numbers are given as the floor, concentric ring, and office number (which is in turn the nearest corridor number followed by the bay number). Thus, office 2B315 is on the second floor, B ring, and nearest to corridor 3 (between corridors 2 and 3). One way to get to this office would be to go to the second floor, get to the A (innermost) ring, go to and take corridor 3, and then turn left on ring B to get to bay 15.

It is possible for a person to walk between any two points in the Pentagon in less than ten minutes, though the most optimal route may involve a brisk walk, routing through the open-air central courtyard, or both. The complex includes eating and exercise facilities as well as meditation and prayer rooms.

Just south of the Pentagon are Pentagon City and Crystal City, extensive shopping, business, and high-density residential districts in Arlington. Arlington National Cemetery is to the north. The Pentagon is surrounded by the relatively complex Pentagon road network.

The Pentagon has six Washington, DC, ZIP Codes (despite its location in Virginia): The Secretary of Defense, the Joint Chiefs of Staff, and the four service branches each have their own ZIP Code.

History

Background

Before the Pentagon was built, the United States Department of War was headquartered in the Munitions Building, a temporary structure erected during World War I along Constitution Avenue on the National Mall. The War Department, which was a civilian agency created to administer the U.S. Army, was spread out in additional temporary buildings on the National Mall, as well as dozens of other buildings in Washington, D.C., Maryland and Virginia. In the late 1930s, during the Great Depression and federal construction program, a new War Department Building was constructed at 21st and C Streets in Foggy Bottom but, upon completion, the new building did not solve the department's space problem. It became the headquarters of the Department of State.

When World War II broke out in Europe in 1939, the War Department rapidly expanded to deal with current issues and in anticipation that the United States would be drawn into the conflict. Secretary of War Henry L. Stimson found the situation unacceptable, with the Munitions Building overcrowded and department offices spread out in additional sites.

Stimson told U.S. President Franklin D. Roosevelt in May 1941 that the War Department needed additional space. On 17 July 1941, a congressional hearing took place, organized by Congressman Clifton Woodrum (D-VA), regarding proposals for new War Department buildings. Woodrum pressed Brigadier General Eugene Reybold, who was representing the War Department at the hearing, for an "overall solution" to the department's "space problem", rather than building yet more temporary buildings. Reybold agreed to report back to the congressman within five days. The War Department called upon its construction chief, General Brehon Somervell, to come up with a plan.

Planning

Government officials agreed that the War Department building, officially designated Federal Office Building No 1, should be constructed across the Potomac River, in Arlington County, Virginia. Requirements for the new building were that it be no more than four stories tall, and that it use a minimal amount of steel to reserve that resource for war needs. The requirements meant that, instead of rising vertically, the building would be sprawling over a large area. Possible sites for the building included the Department of Agriculture's Arlington Experimental Farm, adjacent to Arlington National Cemetery, and the obsolete Hoover Field site.

The site originally chosen was Arlington Farms, which had an asymmetric, roughly pentagonal shape, so the building was planned accordingly as an irregular pentagon. Concerned that the new building could obstruct the view of Washington, D.C., from Arlington Cemetery, President Roosevelt ended up selecting the Hoover Airport site instead. The building retained the pentagonal layout because Roosevelt liked it and a major redesign at that stage would have been costly. Freed of the constraints of the Arlington Farms site, the building was modified as a regular pentagon. It resembled star forts constructed during the gunpowder age.

On 28 July, Congress authorized funding for a new Department of War building in Arlington, which would house the entire department under one roof. President Roosevelt officially approved of the Hoover Airport site on 2 September. While the project went through the approval process in late July 1941, Somervell selected the contractors, including John McShain, Inc. of Philadelphia, which had built Washington National Airport in Arlington, the Jefferson Memorial in Washington, and the National Naval Medical Center in Bethesda, Maryland, along with Wise Contracting Company, Inc. and Doyle and Russell, both from Virginia. In addition to the Hoover Airport site and other government-owned land, construction of the Pentagon required an additional , which were acquired at a cost of $2.2 million (equivalent to $ in ). The Hell's Bottom neighborhood, consisting of numerous pawnshops, factories, approximately 150 homes, and other buildings around Columbia Pike, was cleared to make way for the Pentagon. Later,  of land were transferred to Arlington National Cemetery and to Fort Myer, leaving  for the Pentagon.

Construction

Contracts totaling $31,100,000 (equivalent to $ in ) were finalized with McShain and the other contractors on 11 September 1941, and ground was broken for the Pentagon the same day. A minimal amount of steel was used as it was in short supply during World War II. Instead, the Pentagon was built as a reinforced concrete structure, using 680,000 tons of sand dredged from the Potomac River, and a lagoon was created beneath the Pentagon's river entrance. To minimize steel usage, concrete ramps were built rather than installing elevators. Indiana limestone was used for the building's façade.

Architectural and structural design work for the Pentagon proceeded simultaneously with construction, with initial drawings provided in early October 1941, and most of the design work completed by 1 June 1942. At times the construction work got ahead of the design, with different materials used than those specified in the plans. Pressure to speed up design and construction intensified after the attack on Pearl Harbor on 7 December 1941, with Somervell demanding that  of space at the Pentagon be available for occupation by 1 April 1943. David J. Witmer replaced Bergstrom as chief architect on 11 April after Bergstrom resigned. Unrelated to the Pentagon project, he was charged with improper conduct while having served as president of the American Institute of Architects. Construction was completed 15 January 1943.

Two retaining walls were built to compensate for the elevation variations, and cast-in-place piles were used to deal with the soil conditions. Construction of the Pentagon was completed in approximately 16 months at a total cost of $83 million (equivalent to $ in ).

The building was built wedge by wedge; each wedge was occupied as soon as it was completed, even as construction continued on the remaining wedges.

The Pentagon was designed in accordance with the racial segregation laws in force in the state of Virginia at the time, with separate eating and lavatory accommodations for white and black persons. While the sets of lavatories were side by side, the dining areas for blacks were located in the basement. When Roosevelt visited the facility before its dedication, he ordered removal of the "Whites Only" signs in segregated areas. When the Governor of Virginia protested, Roosevelt's administration responded that the Pentagon, although on Virginia land, was under Federal jurisdiction. In addition, its military and civilian Federal employees were going to comply with the President's policies. As a result, the Pentagon was the only building in Virginia where racial segregation laws were not enforced (these laws were not overturned until 1965). The side-by-side sets of restrooms still exist, but have been integrated in practice since the building was occupied.

Hall of Heroes

On the building's main concourse is the Hall of Heroes, opened 1968 and dedicated to the more than 3,460 recipients of the Medal of Honor, the United States' highest military decoration. The three versions of the Medal of HonorArmy, Sea Service (for the Marine Corps, Navy, and Coast Guard), and Air Force (for the Air Force and Space Force)are on display along with the names of recipients.

The Hall is also used for promotions, retirements, and other ceremonies.

Renovation

From 1998 to 2011, the Pentagon was completely gutted and reconstructed in phases to bring it up to modern standards and improve security and efficiency. Asbestos was removed and all office windows were sealed.

As originally built, most Pentagon office space consisted of open bays which spanned an entire ring. These offices used cross-ventilation from operable windows instead of air conditioning for cooling. Gradually, bays were subdivided into private offices with many using window air conditioning units. With renovations now complete, the new space includes a return to open office bays, and a new Universal Space Plan of standardized office furniture and partitions developed by Studios Architecture.

Pentagon tours were suspended during the COVID-19 pandemic.

Incidents

Protests

During the late 1960s, the Pentagon became a focal point for protests against the Vietnam War. A group of 2,500 women, organized by Women Strike for Peace, demonstrated outside Secretary of Defense Robert S. McNamara's office at the Pentagon on 15 February 1967. In May 1967, a group of 20 demonstrators held a sit-in outside the Joint Chiefs of Staff's office, which lasted four days before they were arrested. In one of the better known incidents, on 21 October 1967, some 35,000 anti-war protesters organized by the National Mobilization Committee to End the War in Vietnam, gathered for a demonstration at the Defense Department (the "March on the Pentagon"). They were confronted by some 2,500 armed soldiers. During the protest, a famous picture was taken, where George Harris placed carnations into the soldiers' gun barrels. The march concluded with an attempt to "exorcise" the building.

On 19 May 1972, the Weather Underground Organization bombed a fourth-floor women's restroom, in "retaliation" for the Nixon administration's bombing of Hanoi in the final stages of the Vietnam War.

On 17 March 2007, 4,000 to 15,000 people (estimates vary significantly) protested the Iraq War by marching from the Lincoln Memorial to the Pentagon's north parking lot.

September 11, 2001 attacks

On September 11, 2001, coincidentally the 60th anniversary of the Pentagon's groundbreaking, five al-Qaeda affiliated hijackers took control of American Airlines Flight 77, en route from Washington Dulles International Airport to Los Angeles International Airport, and deliberately crashed the Boeing 757 airliner into the western side of the Pentagon at 9:37 am EDT as part of the September 11 attacks. The impact of the plane severely damaged the outer ring of one wing of the building and caused its partial collapse. At the time of the attacks, the Pentagon was under renovation and many offices were unoccupied, resulting in fewer casualties. Only 800 of 4,500 people who would have been in the area were there because of the work. Furthermore, the area hit, on the side of the Heliport façade, was the section best prepared for such an attack. The renovation there, improvements which resulted from the Oklahoma City bombing, had nearly been completed.

It was the only area of the Pentagon with a sprinkler system, and it had been reconstructed with a web of steel columns and bars to withstand bomb blasts. The steel reinforcement, bolted together to form a continuous structure through all of the Pentagon's five floors, kept that section of the building from collapsing for 30 minutes—enough time for hundreds of people to crawl out to safety. The area struck by the plane also had blast-resistant windows— thick and  each—that stayed intact during the crash and fire. It had fire doors that opened automatically and newly built exits that allowed people to get out.

Contractors already involved with the renovation were given the added task of rebuilding the sections damaged in the attacks. This additional project was named the "Phoenix Project" and was charged with having the outermost offices of the damaged section occupied by 11 September 2002.

When the damaged section of the Pentagon was repaired, a small indoor memorial and chapel were added at the point of impact. For the fifth anniversary of the September 11 attacks, a memorial of 184 beams of light shone up from the center courtyard of the Pentagon, one light for each victim of the attack. In addition, an American flag is hung each year on the side of the Pentagon damaged in the attacks, and the side of the building is illuminated at night with blue lights. After the attacks, plans were developed for an outdoor memorial, with construction underway in 2006. The benches are aligned along the line of Flight 77 according to the victims' ages, from 3 to 71. The park opened to the public on 11 September 2008.

Gallery

See also

List of National Historic Landmarks in Virginia
List of United States military bases
National Register of Historic Places listings in Arlington County, Virginia
The Octagon, headquarters of the Egyptian Ministry of Defense in the New Administrative Capital
Pentagon Force Protection Agency

Notes

References

Citations

Sources

External links

The Pentagon website (archived version)
Popular Mechanics, March 1943, "Army's Giant Five-by-Five" one of earliest World War II articles on the Pentagon
Pentagon Force Protection Agency
How the Pentagon Got Its Shape – The Washington Post, 26 May 2007

 
Military installations in Virginia
Military headquarters in the United States
Buildings and structures in Arlington County, Virginia
Government buildings completed in 1943
Government buildings on the National Register of Historic Places in Virginia
National Historic Landmarks in Virginia
National Register of Historic Places in Arlington County, Virginia
American Airlines Flight 77
Articles containing video clips
1943 establishments in Virginia
US
September 11 attacks